The 2019–20 Hoofdklasse was the 47th season of the Hoofdklasse, the Netherlands's highest field hockey league. It started on 14 September 2019 and it was scheduled to conclude with the third match of the championship final on 24 May 2020. Due to the COVID-19 pandemic the league was halted on 12 March 2020. The league was declared void on 21 April 2020.

Bloemendaal were the defending champions, having won the 2018–19 season by defeating Kampong in the championship final.

The KNHB decided there will be no relegation and promotion and there won't be a champion. The assignment of the places for the 2021 Euro Hockey League depended on the proceeding of the 2019–20 Euro Hockey League. Bloemendaal was the only team who was qualified regardless.

Teams

A total of 12 teams took part in the league: The best nine teams from the 2018–19 season, the two promotion/relegation play-off winners (Klein Zwitserland and Tilburg) and the 2018–19 Promotieklasse winners (Hurley), who replaced SCHC.

Accommodation and locations

Personnel and kits

Number of teams by province

Regular season

League table

Results

Top goalscorers

References

Men's Hoofdklasse Hockey
Hoofdklasse
Hoofdklasse Hockey Men
Hoofdklasse Hockey Men
Hoofdklasse Hockey